A discography of albums released by the label ACT Music. Distributor catalogue numbers are not provided here.

ACT

EMOCIÓN

References 

 *